Iry-pat ( "member of the elite") was an ancient Egyptian ranking title, that is a title announcing a high position in the hierarchy of the country. Iry-pat was indeed the highest ranking title at the royal court, and only the most important officials could bear this title. The title is already attested in the First Dynasty: one of the first holders was Merka, official under king Qa'a.

In the New Kingdom, the title was often the crown prince and the title announced that the holder was the second ruler in the country. It is therefore sometimes translated as Hereditary or Crown Prince. Under Tutankhamun, Horemheb was officially designated the iry-pat or successor to this pharaoh but did not succeed the boy king since Ay intervened to seize the throne instead for about 4 years before Horemheb assumed power as pharaoh.

References 

Ancient Egyptian titles